The Hoffmann kiln is a series of batch process kilns.  Hoffmann kilns are the most common kiln used in production of bricks and some other ceramic products. Patented by German Friedrich Hoffmann for brickmaking in 1858, it was later used for lime-burning, and was known as the Hoffmann continuous kiln.

Construction and operation
A Hoffmann kiln consists of a main fire passage surrounded on each side by several small rooms.  Each room contains a pallet of bricks.  In the main fire passage there is a fire wagon, that holds a fire that burns continuously.  Each room is fired for a specific time, until the bricks are vitrified properly, and thereafter the fire wagon is rolled to the next room to be fired.

Each room is connected to the next room by a passageway carrying hot gases from the fire. In this way, the hottest gases are directed into the room that is currently being fired.  Then the gases pass into the adjacent room that is scheduled to be fired next.  There the gases preheat the brick.  As the gases pass through the kiln circuit, they gradually cool as they transfer heat to the brick as it is preheated and dried.  This is essentially a counter-current heat exchanger, which makes for a very efficient use of heat and fuel.  This efficiency is a principal advantage of the Hoffmann kiln, and is one of the reasons for its original development and continued use throughout history.  In addition to the inner opening to the fire passage, each room also has an outside door, through which recently fired brick is removed, and replaced with wet brick to be dried and then fired in the next firing cycle.

In a classic Hoffmann kiln, the fire may burn continuously for years, even decades; in Iran, there are kilns that are still active and have been working continuously for 35 years.  Any fuel may be used in a Hoffmann kiln, including gasoline, natural gas, heavy petroleum and wood fuel.  The dimensions of a typical Hoffmann kiln are completely variable, but in average about 5 m (height) x 15 m (width) x 150 m (length).

Historic examples of Hoffmann kilns

The Hoffmann kiln is used in almost every country.

UK
In the British Isles there are only a few Hoffmann kilns remaining, some of which have been preserved.

The only ones with a chimney are at Prestongrange Industrial Heritage Museum and Llanymynech Heritage Area. The site at Llanymynech, close to Oswestry was used for lime-burning and has recently been partially restored as part of an industrial archaeology conservation project supported by English Heritage and the Heritage Lottery Fund.

Two examples in North Yorkshire, the Hoffmann lime-burning kiln at Meal Bank Quarry, Ingleton, and that at the former Craven and Murgatroyd lime works, Langcliffe, are scheduled ancient monuments.

There is an intact but abandoned Hoffmann kiln without a chimney present at Minera Limeworks; the site is abandoned but all entrances to the kiln have been grated-off, preventing access. The kiln is in a very poor state of repair, with trees growing out of the walls and the roof. Minera Quarry Trust hopes one day to develop the area into something of a tourist attraction. The Grade II listed Hoffmann brick kiln in Ilkeston, Derbyshire, is also badly neglected, although the recently installed fencing offers some protection for the building and for visitors.

At Prestongrange Museum, outside Prestonpans in East Lothian, the Hoffman kiln is still standing and visitors can listen to more about it via a mobile phone tour.

There is a nearly complete kiln in Horeb, Carmarthenshire.
 
There is still a working kiln at Kings Dyke in Peterborough, which is the last site of the London Brick Company, owned by Forterra PLC.

Australia
In Victoria, Australia, at the Brunswick brickworks, there are two surviving kilns converted to residences, and a chimney from a third kiln; there is another in Box Hill, Victoria; also in Melbourne. 

In Adelaide, South Australia, the last remaining Hoffman kiln in the state is in at the old Hallett Brickworks site in Torrensville.

There is one at St Peters in Sydney, New South Wales.

In Western Australia, the kiln at the Maylands Brickworks in the Perth suburb of Maylands, which operated from 1927 to 1982 is the only remaining Hoffman kiln in the state.

Catalonia 
Bòbila de Bellamar a Calafell.

Other countries
There is a complete kiln in the restored Tsalapatas brick Factory in Volos Greece that has been converted to an industrial museum.

There are two in New Zealand.

Kaohsiung city in Taiwan is also home to a Hoffman kiln, built by the Japanese government in 1899.

References

External links
History of Hoffman
Preston Grange tour site
Evaluation of Hoffman Kiln Technology
RCAHMS Canmore

Industrial processes
Kilns
Lime kilns
Firing techniques